József Szájer (born 7 September 1961) is a retired Hungarian politician and former Member of the European Parliament (MEP) of the Fidesz party. He resigned as MEP on 29 November 2020 (effective at the end of December) after having been caught by Belgian police after a gay sex orgy on the night of 27 November, in violation of local COVID-19 regulations.

Early life and education 
József Szájer was born in Sopron on 7 September 1961 as the eldest son of schoolmaster József Szájer, Sr. and primary school teacher Edit Kiss. His parents died of carbon monoxide poisoning on 26 November 1982. As a result, Szájer became the guardian of his younger brothers at the age of 21. He finished his elementary and secondary studies at his birthplace.

Szájer studied at Bibó István College and graduated as legal expert from Eötvös Loránd University (ELTE) in Budapest in 1986. He then worked for a decade as lecturer at ELTE's department of Roman Law. Receiving a scholarship from the Soros Foundation, he also attended Balliol College, Oxford, from 1986 to 1987 and moving for research at the University of Michigan from 1988 to 1989. He passed the bar exam in 1996, after which he practiced as a lawyer. Szájer served as the first president of the Oxford Hungarian Society (OHS) from 1987.

Political career

Within Hungary
In 1988, Szájer joined Fidesz as founding member of the party, and took part in the Hungarian Round Table Talks from 1989 to 1990. In 1990, he was elected member of the Hungarian Parliament – a seat he would maintain until he became an MEP in 2004.
From 1994 to 2002 he headed the Fidesz parliamentary group, and from 1998 to 2002 he chaired the Parliament's European integration committee. He served as vice-president of Fidesz from 1996 until 2003, and from 2000 to 2012 he was member of the Board of Council of Europe. 

In 2007, he became a founding member of Szabadság kör.

While serving as MEP, in 2010 Szájer was appointed to chair the drafting committee of the new Constitution of Hungary and led the national consultative committee. The draft was written by Szájer on his iPad. The committee put forward several notable changes to the constitution, including a proposal to allow parents to vote in elections on behalf of their underage children and an article banning abortion. The new constitution also emphasised the definition of marriage as being between man and woman, in an apparent repudiation of calls for the recognition of same-sex marriage.

European Parliament
In 2003, Szájer joined the Convention on the Future of Europe and was an observer member of the European Parliament, ahead of Hungary's EU accession. In 2004, Szájer was first elected to the European Parliament and appointed among the vice-chairmen of the Group of the European People's Party and European Democrats. From 2004 to 2007, Szájer served as a member of the Committee on the Internal Market and Consumer Protection, then as a member of the Committee on Constitutional Affairs (2007–2014). 

In 2008, he became a signatory of the Prague Declaration on European Conscience and Communism. In 2009, re-elected, he was appointed head of the Hungarian EPP delegation (until 2011) and chief whip and vice-chairman of the European People's Party group (until 2020). From 2014 until his resignation in 2020, he was an active member of the Committee on Legal Affairs. Szájer was a substitute for the Committee on International Trade, and a member of the Delegation for relations with the United States.

Gay sex party and resignation
Szájer resigned as MEP on 29 November 2020 (effective at the end of December), after having been caught by Belgian police on the night of 27 November fleeing a private 25-man orgy above a gay bar, hosted by David Manzheley, in violation of local coronavirus regulations. Szájer was not an invited guest to the party and was accompanied by a friend. The party was interrupted after neighbors called the police to complain about the noise. All attendees of the party were issued a €250 fine.

According to a statement from the federal prosecutor's office, he was seen fleeing via a window and a rain gutter's downspout, his hands were bloody, and an ecstasy pill was found in his backpack, though he denied the drug was his. He was unable to produce any identity documents on the spot, so police escorted him to his home, where he identified himself using a diplomatic passport. Prior to the scandal, there were already rumors of him being gay, which former Fidesz politician Klára Ungár publicly asserted in 2015.

Szájer left Fidesz on 2 December 2020. Prime Minister and party leader Viktor Orbán told Magyar Nemzet: "what our fellow member József Szájer has done does not fit into the values of our political community. We will not forget and refuse his thirty years of work, but his actions are unacceptable and indefensible". Fellow MEPs, including Márton Gyöngyösi (Jobbik), Manon Aubry (La France Insoumise), and Terry Reintke (Alliance 90/The Greens), accused Szájer and Fidesz of hypocrisy in light of the party's stances on LGBT issues. According to opposition party leader András Fekete-Győr (Momentum Movement), the incident reveals the "complete moral bankruptcy of Fidesz".

In the following days, a memorial plaque was appended to the rain gutter that Szájer had descended to escape the sex party. Street artist Laika also created a mural in Rome representing Szájer as a gay icon.

Awards
In 2000, Szájer received the honour of Knight Commander of St Michael and St George (KCMG) from Queen Elizabeth II.

In 2010, he became an honorary citizen of Sopron. Following his scandal, he resigned from the honorary citizenship on 3 December 2020.

In 2019, he received the Petőfi Prize.

Personal life 
Szájer has been married since 1983 to Tünde Handó, who became a justice on the Constitutional Court of Hungary in January 2020. The couple have a daughter born in 1987.

In 2015, Alliance of Free Democrats member Klára Ungár, who is openly lesbian, stated that Szájer and another Fidesz politician Máté Kocsis were gay. Kocsis brought a defamation lawsuit against Ungár. He won in the lower court, but lost on appeal. Szájer did not react to the statement.

Books
Jogállam, szabadság, rendszerváltoztatás (1998)
Európa (2004)
Szabad Magyarország, szabad Európa (2014)
Ne bántsd a magyart! Gondolatok a bevándorlásról, a Fideszről, Magyarországról, Alaptörvényünkről és Európáról (2019)

See also 

 List of members of the European Parliament for Hungary, 2014–2019
 List of members of the European Parliament for Hungary, 2019–2024
 LGBT rights in Hungary

References

Further reading

External links

 
 
Fidesz
Szabad Magyarország, szabad Európa book
Jogállam, Szabadság, Rendszerváltoztatás book
 

|-

1961 births
Living people
Budapest University alumni
Fidesz politicians
Fidesz MEPs
Members of the National Assembly of Hungary (1990–1994)
Members of the National Assembly of Hungary (1994–1998)
Members of the National Assembly of Hungary (1998–2002)
Members of the National Assembly of Hungary (2002–2006)
MEPs for Hungary 2004–2009
MEPs for Hungary 2009–2014
MEPs for Hungary 2014–2019
MEPs for Hungary 2019–2024
University of Michigan fellows
Honorary Knights Commander of the Order of St Michael and St George
People from Sopron